The Caribbean Football Union (CFU) is the representative organization for football associations in the Caribbean. It represents 25 FIFA member nations, as well as 6 territories that are not affiliated to FIFA. The Union was established in January 1978 and its Member Associations compete in the CONCACAF region.

The CFU also runs developmental competitions, including a women's and boys' and girls' Challenge Series.

History
The formation of the Caribbean Football Union is credited to former Trinidad and Tobago national footballer Patrick Raymond. In 1976, he approached Phil Woosnam, the Commissioner of the North American Soccer League (NASL), about ownership of a Caribbean franchise within the NASL, and instead, Woosnam proposed the formation of a Caribbean Professional League. Acting on Woosnam's advice, and with assistance from former England player-turned businessman Jimmy Hill and his company World Sports Academy, plus the recommendation of former FIFA President Sir Stanley Rous, that a Caribbean regional governing body as a sub-group within CONCACAF be the first order of business, Raymond introduced the initiative in August 1977 in Port of Spain, Trinidad, that eventually led to the formation of the Caribbean Football Union (CFU). The CFU was inaugurated on January 28, 1978, in Port-au-Prince, Haiti, as the Caribbean region's governing football body and a sub-group within CONCACAF.

A previous effort to establish a Caribbean regional governing body was the British Caribbean Football Association (BCFA) in January 1957, with the Trinidad & Tobago FA's President Ken Galt as the BCFA's president, and the TTFA's Secretary Eric James as General Secretary, and in 1959, a representative BCFA team toured the UK.

In May 2013, under the direction of Damien E. Hughes, the CFU relocated their offices from Port-of-Spain, Trinidad to Kingston, Jamaica. In August 2015, Hughes was replaced by Antiguan Neil Cochrane. Cochrane announced that several jobs would be moved from Jamaica to Antigua and a smaller headquarters would be rented.

Corruption scandal

The union was embroiled in a scandal in May 2011 after several representatives of Caribbean Football Associations had been given brown paper envelopes containing US$40,000. The incident was reported to the CONCACAF general secretary Chuck Blazer. The next day, footage from a private meeting between CFU officials was leaked to the public.  This footage showed President Jack Warner informing the delegates who had received envelopes that the funds within were for their personal use, stating,"If you're pious, you should go to church." An investigation initiated by FIFA examined the actions of over 30 CFU representatives and resulted in the resignation of the CFU president, the suspension of the organization's vice-presidents and staff, and the resignation of several national football association staff.

Competitions

The Caribbean Football Union holds two cups:

The CFU Championship was a tournament for national teams in the region active between 1978 and 1988. It was sometimes referred to as the CFU Nations Cup. The Caribbean Cup was the international cup for the Caribbean between 1989 and 2017; the top 4 teams in the tournament used to qualify for the CONCACAF Gold Cup.

The Caribbean Club Championship is the championship for Caribbean club teams. The winner qualified for the CONCACAF Champions' Cup from 1997 and until 2008, and from 2008–09 until 2016–17, the top 3 clubs qualified for a preliminary round of the CONCACAF Champions League. Since 2017, the winner of the rebranded Caribbean Club Championship qualifies for the knockout stage of the CONCACAF Champions League, while second, third, and the winner of a play-off between fourth place and the winner of the second-tier Caribbean Club Shield qualify for the CONCACAF League.

Previously the CFU had organised a pan-Caribbean league, the Caribbean Professional Football League; it was active between 1992 and 1994.

Current title holders

1No outright winner or champion emerges from this competition as it is not a competitive championship.

Representative team

A Caribbean national team has played several exhibition fixtures. In 1987 a Caribbean XI entertained Brazilian São Paulo FC and a year later a 'Caribbean Selection' played against the national team of Trinidad and Tobago. Since the formation of the CFU, games have typically taken place in Port of Spain.

In August 1993, CFU President Jack Warner ruled out the possibility of merging the Caribbean nations into one national football team, similar to the West Indies cricket team. He said: "There seems to be some myth outside there that a Caribbean team is the answer to football in the region. I have never heard anything so ludicrous," said Warner, "If to reach a [FIFA] World Cup have to be considered by size, why haven't China ever made it. The simple fact is, we must take whatever seems to be our liabilities and make them our assets. Being small is never a liability in this sport".

Presidents
There have been three presidents (and three acting presidents) of the CFU since its foundation:
  André Kamperveen (1978–1982)
  Jack Warner (1983–2011)
  Lisle Austin (2011) (acting president)
  Yves Jean-Bart (2011–2012) (acting president)
  Gordon Derrick (2012–2017)
  Randolph Harris (2017–2018) (acting president)
  Randolph Harris (2018–)

General secretaries
There have been seven general secretaries of the CFU since its foundation:
  Jack Warner (1978–1982)
  Ivan Barrow (1983–1993)
  Harold Taylor (1993–2005)
  Kerry-Ann Alleyne (2006)
  Angenie Kanhai (2007–2011)
  Damien Hughes (2012–2015)
  Neil Cochrane (2015–2018)

Staff

:

Member associations

Current members

Potential future members
Saint-Barthélemy became an overseas collectivity of France in February 2007, the same political status as Saint Martin.

Following the dissolution of the Netherlands Antilles in 2010, the public bodies of Saba and Sint Eustatius could become eligible to compete as separate entities within the Caribbean Football Union. Bonaire, which also has this political status, became a CFU member (and CONCACAF associate member) in April 2013. (Bonaire became a full member of CONCACAF in June 2014.) Each of these areas is an integral part of the Netherlands.

The islands of Saint Pierre and Miquelon are in the North American region, like Bermuda (a CFU member), but are currently not affiliated with either FIFA or CONCACAF. However, the French overseas collectivity has the same political status as French Polynesia, who play in the Oceania Football Confederation as Tahiti. The islands competed as Saint Pierre at the 2010 and 2012 Coupes de l'Outre-Mer. As such, it would appear that Saint Pierre is not precluded from joining CONCACAF and potentially, like Bermuda, the Caribbean Football Union.

See also
CONCACAF
UNCAF
North American Football Union (NAFU)
North American Football Confederation (NAFC)
Confederacion Centroamericana y del Caribe de Futbol (CCCF)

References

External links
 

 
Association football sub-confederations
1
 
Sports organizations established in 1978
1978 establishments in North America
1978 establishments in South America